King of the Surf Guitar is the second studio album of surf music by Dick Dale, released in 1963, featuring original and cover songs.

Track listing
"King of the Surf Guitar" (Alonzo Willis) – 2:06
"The Lonesome Road" (Nathaniel Shilkret, Gene Austin) – 3:14
"Kansas City" (Jerry Leiber, Mike Stoller) – 2:43
"Dick Dale Stomp" (Dick Dale) – 2:12
"What'd I Say" (Ray Charles) – 3:24
"Greenback Dollar" (Hoyt Axton, Ken Ramsey) – 2:52
"Hava Nagila" (Jewish folk song) – 2:04
"You Are My Sunshine" (Jimmie Davis, Charles Mitchell) – 1:58
"Mexico" (Boudleaux Bryant) – 2:10
"Break Time" (Dick Dale) – 2:45
"Riders in the Sky" (Stan Jones) – 2:11
"If I Never Get to Heaven" (Jenny Lou Carson, Roy Botkin) – 2:55

Personnel
 Dick Dale – lead guitar
 Art Munson – guitar
 Rene Hall – guitar
 Glen Campbell – guitar
 Barney Kessel – guitar
 Nick O'Malley – guitar
 Ray Sambra – bass
 Bryan Dietz – bass
 Leon Russell – piano
 Bill Barber – piano
 Hal Blaine – drums
 Jack Lake – drums
 Jerry Stevens – drums
 Jerry Brown – saxophone
 Lee Farrell – saxophone
 Larry Gillette – saxophone
 Risdon Gwartney – saxophone
 Barry Rillera – saxophone
 Armon Frank – saxophone
 The Blossoms – background vocals

References

1963 albums
Albums produced by Voyle Gilmore
Capitol Records albums
Dick Dale albums